Tsumeb railway station is a station located in the mining town of Tsumeb in northeastern Namibia.

History

Trains

Transport 
It is served by a mostly freight railway.  The extension of the railway towards the Angolan border in 2012 provided a bypass formed by a Triangle, and Tsumeb station now finds itself a terminal station east of the triangle.

Tsumeb has a plant for the manufacture of concrete sleepers.

Nearest airports
The nearest airports are Ondangwa Airport at Ondangwa, Tsumeb Airport at Tsumeb, and Otjiwarongo Airport at Otjiwarongo.

Adjacent station(s) 
 North – Ondangwa, Oshikango
 West – Otavi

See also 
 Railway stations in Namibia
 Transport in Namibia
 Oshikoto Region
 Etosha National Park

References

External links 

Tsumeb
Buildings and structures in Oshikoto Region
Railway stations in Namibia
TransNamib Railway